Nymphicula perirrorata is a moth in the family Crambidae. It was described by George Hampson in 1917. It is found in Ghana, Ivory Coast, Malawi, Nigeria, Sierra Leone, South Africa, Sudan and Zimbabwe.

The wingspan is 9–13 mm. The forewings are white, suffused with fuscous and with yellow subbasal and antemedian fasciae. The middle of the wing is creamy white with scattered dark fuscous scales. The base of the hindwings is white, the median area scattered with dark fuscous scales. Adults have been recorded on wing from February to March, in May, from June to August, October and November.

References

Nymphicula
Moths described in 1917